Cassius Emlen Urban (February 26, 1863 – May 21, 1939) was a Lancaster, Pennsylvania-based architect.  He was the leading architect in Lancaster from the 1890s to the 1920s.

Biography 
He was born on February 26, 1863, to Barbara Hebble and Amos S. Urban in Conestoga Township, Lancaster County, Pennsylvania.  He graduated from Lancaster’s Boys High School in 1880, and then apprenticed as a draftsman at the E. L. Walter architectural firm in Scranton, Pennsylvania. Emlen also worked in the office of Willis G. Hale in Philadelphia. He returned to Lancaster in 1886.  He designed many of Lancaster’s notable buildings including the Farmer's Southern Market on Queen Street in 1888, the Watt & Shand Department Store in 1898, and the Y.M.C.A., Harold's Building, Unitarian Church, and St. James Episcopal Church parish House on Duke Street in 1903.  His designs embraced architectural styles as diverse as Queen Anne, Beaux-Arts, and Colonial Revival.  His work forms a bridge between the Victorian Era and the Modern Age.

C. Emlen Urban also worked in Hershey, Pennsylvania during its developing period.  Urban knew Milton Hershey through Lancaster's Hamilton Club.  As Hershey developed, Urban designed all of the main buildings constructed between 1903 and 1926, including the Original Hershey Chocolate Company Offices and factory (1903), Cocoa House (1 Chocolate Avenue) (1905), Hershey Trust Company (1 W. Chocolate Avenue) (1914), Community Building and Hershey Theatre (14 E. Chocolate Avenue) (1915, 1928-1932), and Convention Hall (former Hershey Museum building) (1915).

He died on May 21, 1939, in Lancaster, Pennsylvania.

Selected works

Individual listings on the National Register of Historic Places

 1888: Farmer's Southern Market, Lancaster, Pennsylvania
 1891: Charlie Wagner's Cafe, Lancaster, Pennsylvania
 1904-1905: Stevens High School, Lancaster, Pennsylvania
 1910: Lancaster Trust Company, Lancaster, Pennsylvania
 1910-1911: Reilly Brothers and Raub Building, Lancaster, Pennsylvania
 1910-1911: Hager Building, Lancaster, Pennsylvania
 1911-1912: Kirk Johnson Building, Lancaster, Pennsylvania
 1915, 1928-1932: Hershey Community Center Building, Hershey, Pennsylvania
 1924-1925: W. W. Griest Building, Lancaster, Pennsylvania

Contributing properties to historic districts

 Lancaster City Historic District
 Ephrata Commercial Historic District
 Manheim Borough Historic District
 Northeast Lancaster Township Historic District

C. Emlen Urban Awards
The Historic Preservation Trust of Lancaster County holds an annual meeting and awards banquet in honor of Urban. The C. Emlen Urban Awards are given to individuals and organizations for their work in protecting and preserving historical structures in Lancaster County.

Past Award Recipients: 
 Central Market
 Ephrata National Bank
 Excelsior
 Fulton Elementary School
 Lancaster Ironworks Apartments
 Luca Restaurant
 Nissley Vineyards
 Rock Ford Plantation
 Urban Place
 Wilbur Chocolate Factory

References

External links
"To Build Strongand Substantial: The Career of Architect C. Emlen Urban," Produced by The City of Lancaster, Pennsylvania, 2009

1863 births
1939 deaths
Architects from Pennsylvania
Artists from Lancaster, Pennsylvania
People from Lancaster County, Pennsylvania